The Sex Factor was an online reality TV series produced by xHamster where eight men and eight women compete to become a porn star. The sixteen contestants had never had sex on camera prior to the series. The show is hosted by Asa Akira, and features Lexi Belle, Tori Black, Remy LaCroix, and Keiran Lee as mentors and judges. Belle Knox was initially going to host the show, but was replaced by Akira.

The show has one male and one female winner. The winners get a three-year contract with a porn film production company and an undisclosed amount of money, for a total amount of $1 million in prize value.

Filming 

Casting took place in two rounds: one in December 2014 and one in January 2015, during that year's AVN Expo. Filming took place during early 2015, with pauses of months between episodes. None of the performers have been paid for their presence in the show, apart from trip reimbursements.

Contestants 

The 16 contestants who competed to win The Sex Factor are:

Male 

 Donnie Rock, 31, from Denver, Colorado.
 Barry Newport, 24, from Orange County, CA.
 David Caspian, 25, from Bronx, NY. In Episode 1 he claimed to have had sex with 3 women prior to filming.
 Buddy Hollywood, 26, from Las Vegas, NV. In Episode 1 he claimed to have had sex with over 100 women prior to filming.
 Sonny Keegan, 28, from Detroit, MI. Professional strip club DJ.
 Hero D. Protagonist, 26, software engineer from Austin, TX.
 The Colonel, 32, from Raleigh, NC. Adult on Autism Spectrum with something to prove.
 Johnny Black, 22, from Charleston, SC.

Female 

 Blair Williams, 22, from Los Angeles, CA. She was a former church preschool teacher and claimed to have not been a virgin for a year in Episode 1.
 Kaelin Blake, 23, from Winchester, KY.
 Adrian Lee Ray, 26, from upstate New York. A Suicide Girl, in Episode 6 is discovered to have lied to the producers of the show, having shot a scene with James Deen.
 Khaya Peake, 23, from Brighton, UK.
 Veronica Vain, 23, from New York City.
 Sydney Gilmour, 22, a professional tattoo artist from Miami, FL.
 Dani Darko, 22, from Las Vegas.
 Allie Eve Knox, 26, from Dallas, TX, with a master's degree in anthropology. In Episode 1 she claimed to have had sex with four people prior to filming. In an interview for ABC News she claimed to have joined the show to make money in order to pay her student loans.

Results 

Notes

 The girls won the challenge and they could cast votes to send one male contestant home. Three girls voted against Donnie Rock, while one voted against Sonny Keegan. David Caspian received four votes from the girls, eliminating him from the contest despite the judges' affection towards him.  
 The girls had a photoshoot done by Holly Randall and the judges chose Allie Eve Knox as the winner. Veronica Vain revealed she had been given an offer she couldn't refuse and wanted to leave the competition, so no contestant was eliminated. The judges invited David Caspian to join the guys in a strip club in this episode and learn how to dance as a male stripper. 
 There was no elimination in this episode as the challenge was not complete and continues in the next episode. Allie Eve Knox, the winner of episode 2, is seen participating in a photoshoot by Holly Randall for Hustler magazine. 
 There was no elimination in this episode as the challenge was not complete and continues in the next episode. Blair discovered that Adrian has previously acted in a professional porn film by James Deen, potentially disqualifying her from the contest.
 There was no elimination in this episode as the challenge was not complete and continues in the next episode.
 The challenge from the previous two episodes was concluded, with the winners being declared having the Sex Factor.

References

Further reading

External links
 
 

Reality web series
American non-fiction web series
2010s American reality television series
Pornographic television shows
Internet properties established in 2016